John Baselmans (born May 20, 1954 in Waalre, North Brabant) is a Dutch artist, sculptor, graphic designer, and illustrator. He was born in Aalst but has lived and worked in Curaçao, Netherlands Antilles since 1982.  Since 1984, Baselmans has designed postal stamps for the post office of the Netherlands Antilles and has worked as an illustrator for different schoolbooks. His pen drawings are made in a combination of pen and ink, color pencils, and soft pastel chalk.

Baselmans started to draw at the age of three. His father taught him woodcarving, working with clay, painting, and other techniques which he still uses. He attended the Graphic School (University) and The Free Academy in Eindhoven in the Netherlands. Afterwards, he attended several drawing courses such as airbrush and architectural rendering in the United States. More recently, he has organized exhibitions in several countries, and has written several e-books.

Exhibitions 
1972 Kabbendans - Eindhoven, Netherlands
1972 Abbenhuis - Eindhoven, Netherlands
1973 Kabbendans - Eindhoven, Netherlands
1974 Kabbendans - Eindhoven, Netherlands
1977 Unilever  - Duiven, Netherlands
1980 Huis in 't Park - Eindhoven, Netherlands
1981 Piazza center  - Eindhoven, Netherlands
1981 Stadhuis zaal - Eindhoven, Netherlands
1981 Stadhuis - Gouda, Netherlands
1981 De Tempel - Curaçao, Netherlands Antilles
1982 Centro Bolivar Y Bello - Curaçao, Netherlands Antilles
1983 Taverne - Curaçao, Netherlands Antilles
1983 Assencion - Curaçao, Netherlands Antilles
1984 Curacaosche museum - Curaçao, Netherlands Antilles
1984 Sentro Pro arte  - Curaçao, Netherlands Antilles
1985 Curacaosche museum - Curaçao, Netherlands Antilles
1986 Zeelandia - Curaçao, Netherlands Antilles
1988 Seaquarium - Curaçao, Netherlands Antilles
1989 Gallery ABN - Aruba - Netherlands Antilles
1989 Gallery Artishock - Aruba - Netherlands Antilles
1990 Graphic Art Gallery - Curaçao, Netherlands Antilles
2003 Villa Maria - Curaçao, Netherlands Antilles
2004 Gallery 86 - Curaçao, Netherlands Antilles

Stamp design 
-Baselmans designed about 200 stamps for the Postal Service of the Netherlands Antilles
Catalog; Postzegels van Nederlandse & Overzeese rijksdelen  NRS. FDC Se:

References 

"Grafische school" Eindhoven, Netherlands, 1999 till 1971, Special drawing classes G2E and G3E, Director Mr Janssen
"Vrije Kunstakademie" Eindhoven, Netherlands 1971 till 1975, Director Mr Jan Kuhr
Publications Exhibition the Netherlands, 1972 till 1984; Groot Eindhoven, Eindhovens Dagblad, Woensels Belang, Dagblad van het Zuiden.
Publications Exhibitions Antilles 1981 Till 2007; Local/International newspapers, A.D., Amigoe Antillen, Beurs en Nieuwsberichten, Extra, Ulto morticia, Amigoe Aruba.
All the newspaper articles written about Mr. Baselmans are collected, and can be read at the following links:
Exhibitions (55 publications)
Stamp publications (60 publications)
Other publications in papers and books (20 publications)
Most of the articles are also stored in the National library of the Netherlands Antilles

Illustrations and written books.
Postal service of the Netherlands Antilles, 1994, "Stamp Collection 1994", Mr.Galmeijer
"Op avontuur door alfabethland"(local schoolbooks), part 1 (1990) and 2 (1991), Mrs R Sifhrin
Various school books( without ISBN numbers) "Taal kabaal" and "Allemaal Taal", 1998-1999 production of APS, Utrecht, Netherland
“Juli”  Rotary, Curaçao, 2002
“Fiesta di Kuenta”  Rotary, Curaçao, 2002
"Club di Seru Altu” part 1 (2002) and 2 (2003), production of APS, Utrecht, Netherland
Several articles in Dutch version of Wikipedia, 2007
See also library University of the Netherlands Antilles

Books written by John Baselmans
Publisher LoBa LoBa productions
Onze Cultuur 
Makamba 
Mañan-Morgen 
De wijsheden van onze oudjes 
Hé oudje, leef je nog? 
Eiland-je bewoner Bundel 
Eiland-je bewoner Deel 2 
Eiland-je bewoner Deel 1 
Eiland-je bewoner 
Curacao achter gesloten deuren 
De matrix van het systeem Deel 1 
De matrix van het systeem Deel 2 
The hidden world part 1 
The hidden world part 2 
Geloof en het geloven 
Dieptepunt 
Namen/Names 
Drugs 
De protocollen van Sion 21ste eeuw 
Verboden publicaties 
De maatschappelijke beerput 
Achter de sociale mediaschermen 
Project Corona/COVID-19 
De Missende link 
Curatele 
Curaçao maffia eiland 
Zwartboek van Curaçao 
Mi bida no bal niun sèn 
Pech gehad 
Geboren voor één cent 
Help de Antillen verzuipen 
Moderne slavernij in het systeem 
Ingezonden 
Lifework Deluxe Edition 1 ISBN none
Lifework Deluxe Edition 2 ISBN none
John Baselmans’ Lifework (Part 1) 
John Baselmans’ Lifework (Part 2) 
John Baselmans’ Lifework (Part 3) 
John Baselmans’ Lifework (Part 4) 
Leren tekenen met gevoel 
Drawing humans in black and white 
The world of drawing humans 
John Baselmans Drawing Course 
The secret behind my drawings 
Levenscirkel (Uit de cyclus van het energieniale leven) 
Utopia (Uit de cyclus van het energieniale leven) 
Vrijheid en liefde (Uit de cyclus van het energieniale leven) 
Dimensies (Uit de cyclus van het energieniale leven) 
Hologram (Uit de cyclus van het energieniale leven) 
Het lang verborgen geheim (Uit de cyclus van het energieniale leven) 
Zelfgenezing (Uit de cyclus van het energieniale leven) 
Dood is dood (Uit de cyclus van het energieniale leven) 
Het energieniale leven  
The world of positive energy 
Words of wisdom (Part3) 
Words of wisdom (Part 2) 
Words of wisdom (Part 1) 
Words of wisdom (Part 4) 
NU deel 12 
NU deel 11 
NU deel 10 
NU deel 9 
NU deel 8 
NU deel 7 
NU deel 6 
NU deel 5 
NU deel 4 
NU deel 3 
NU deel 2 
NU deel 1 
Het dagboek van een eilandstek 
Jonathan en Shalimar ISBN none
Publications postal stamps 1984 till 2007, "Special catalog Postalstamps" , Philately department Postal Netherlands Antilles, Director Mr. S.Paulina

1954 births
Living people
People from Waalre
Curaçao artists
Dutch artists
Dutch emigrants to Curaçao
Dutch graphic designers